Congolese soukous band Zaïko Langa Langa has released 31 official studio albums, 4 live albums, 22 compilations, 1 mix album and 1 remix album.

Albums

Studio albums

Live albums

Compilation albums

Remix albums

Mixes

Singles

1970s

1980s

Maxi-singles

Videos

Video albums 

 Jamais Sans Nous (1992)
 Avis De Recherche (1995)
 Sans Issue (1996)
 Backline Lesson One (includes bonus music videos, 1997)
 Nous Y Sommes (1998)
 Poison (2000)
 Feeling (2001)
 Empreinte (includes music videos of album Eureka, 2004)
 Rencontres (2007)
 Sisikaaaaaahh ! Moto na Moto na... (2014)

References list 

Discographies of Democratic Republic of the Congo artists